The Esa Unggul University (Indonesian: Universitas Esa Unggul, abbreviated as UEU) is a private university and located in 4 different areas in Jakarta, Tangerang dan Bekasi. Esa Unggul University was established on 1993.

History
Esa Unggul University (UEU) was founded in 1993 under the auspices of the “Kemala Bangsa Education Foundation”, a leading private university and one of the best private universities in Indonesia that has a vision which is to become one of World-class universities based on intellectuality, creativity, and entrepreneurship which excels in quality management and execution of University’s value of education, research, and community service. And has the Mission to organize quality and relevant education, Creating a conducive academic atmosphere, Creating leaders with character and high competitiveness.

Academics

Faculty
The university comprises 10 faculties which offer courses at diploma, undergraduate and postgraduate levels.

Faculty of Design and Creative Industry
 Visual Communication Design
 Product Design
 Design interior
Faculty of Economics
 Business Management
 Business Sector Accounting
Faculty of Physiotherapy
 Physiotherapy
 Physiotherapy Profession
Faculty of Law
 Law
Faculty of Health Science
 Public Health
 Science of Nutrition
 Dietitian Profession
 Nursing Science
 Nurse Profession
 Medical Records
 Health Information Management
 Biotechnology
 Pharmacy
Faculty of Computer Science
 Informatics Engineering
 Information Systems
Faculty of Communication
 Marketing Communications 
 Journalism
 Public Relations
 Broadcasting
Faculty of Teacher Training and Education
 Primary Teacher Education
 English Language Education
Faculty of Physchology
 Psychology
Faculty of Engineering
 Industrial Engineering
 Urban and Regional Planning
 Survey and Mapping
 Civil Engineering

Collaboration
UEU collaborates with:
Nanjing Xiaozhuang University in Informatics Engineering and Business Mandarin graduate program
University of Indonesia
Bandung Institute of Technology
Udayana University
Kasetsart University
Mahidol University
Nanjing Normal University
Nanjing Xiaozhuang University
North China Electric Power University
Burapha University
Philippine Christian University
University of Alberta
University of Economics and Law
National University of Malaysia
Woosong University
Honam University
Olivarez College
The Manila Times College

Location and Campuses
The university has four campuses.
Universitas Esa Unggul Kampus Jakarta: Jalan Arjuna Utara No.9, Kebon Jeruk, Jakarta 11510.
Universitas Esa Unggul Kampus Tangerang: Jl. Citra Raya Boulevard Blok. S 25/ 01, Kelurahan Panongan, Kecamatan Panongan, Kabupaten Tangerang, Banten 15711.
Universitas Esa Unggul Kampus Bekasi: Jalan Harapan Indah Boulevard No. 2, Pusaka Rakyat, Kec. Tarumajaya, Bekasi, West Java 17214.
Universitas Esa Unggul Kampus International: Jl. Raya Legok – Karawaci, Curug Sangereng, Klp. Dua, Tangerang, Banten 15810 (Majestic Point Serpong).

Notable alumni
Kezia Warouw, Indonesian model, Presenter and Puteri Indonesia 2016 winner, Miss Phoenix Smile & Top 13 of Miss Universe 2016.
Bunga Jelitha, Indonesian model and Puteri Indonesia 2017 winner, Supermodel International 2011 & Guess Girl South East Asia 2015.
Isman Thoyib, Indonesia men's national basketball team.
Dimyati Natakusumah, member of Indonesian People's Representative Council (2009-2018)
Irna Narulita, current regent of Pandeglang Regency
Abraham Damar Grahita, Indonesia men's national basketball team

References

1993 establishments in Indonesia